Barbara Gorgoń (sometimes shown as Barbara Gorgoń-Flont; born 11 January 1936 in Gródek nad Dunajcem - April 13, 2020) was a Polish former luger who competed between the late 1950s and the mid-1960s. She won the bronze medal in the women's singles event at the 1958 FIL World Luge Championships in Krynica, Poland.

Gorgoń also finished fifth in the women's singles event at the 1964 Winter Olympics in Innsbruck.

References
 Hickok sports information on World champions in luge and skeleton.
 Wallechinsky, David. (1984). "Luge – Men's singles". The Complete Book of the Olympics: 1896–1980. New York: Penguin Books. p. 577.
 Wspomnienie - Barbara Gorgoń-Flont - "piękna i dobra"

Lugers at the 1964 Winter Olympics
Polish female lugers
1936 births
2020 deaths
Olympic lugers of Poland
People from Nowy Sącz County
Sportspeople from Lesser Poland Voivodeship